Reward was an mining site in Inyo County, California.

A post office operated at Reward from 1900 to 1906. The town's name originates from a local mining company, Reward Consolidated Mining Co, who operated the gold and silver Eclipse Mine in 1878 at the site.

References

External links
 

Unincorporated communities in Inyo County, California
Ghost towns in Inyo County, California
Unincorporated communities in California